Sheykh Rajab (also known as Sehrajab and Shekhradzhab) is a village in Bedevostan-e Gharbi Rural District, Khvajeh District, Heris County, East Azerbaijan Province, Iran. At the 2006 census, its population was 825, in 185 families.

References 

Populated places in Heris County